A pun is a figure of speech that plays on words that are similar to each other.

Pun or PUN may also refer to:
 Pun (surname), a Chinese, English, and Magar surname
 PunBB, an internet discussion board system, originally known as Pun
 Type punning, a computer programming technique
  or National Unity Party, a political party in Haiti
  or National Unity Party, a political party in Guinea-Bissau
  or National Unity Party, a political party in Mozambique
  or National Union Party, a political party in Costa Rica
 Pun, a tool used to tamp down clay in puddling
 Pull-up network, an arrangement of PMOS logic

PuN may refer to:
 Plutonium(III)-nitride, a radioactive substance

See also
 Big Pun, a rapper
 Sita Tiwaree, Thai politician with the nickname, Pun